The 2016–17 Eastern Washington Eagles Women's basketball team represented Eastern Washington University during the 2016–17 NCAA Division I women's basketball season. The Eagles, led by 16th year head coach Wendy Schuller, played their home games at Reese Court as members of the Big Sky Conference. They finished the season 19–14, 12–6 in Big Sky play to finish in fourth place. They advanced to the semifinals of the Big Sky women's tournament where they lost to Montana State. They were invited to the Women's Basketball Invitational where they defeated Texas State in the first round before losing in the quarterfinals to Big Sky member Idaho.

Roster

Schedule

|-
!colspan=8 style="background:#a10022; color:#FFFFFF;"| Exhibition

|-
!colspan=8 style="background:#a10022; color:#FFFFFF;"| Non-conference regular season

|-
!colspan=8 style="background:#a10022; color:#FFFFFF;"| Big Sky regular season

|-
!colspan=9 style="background:#a10022; color:#FFFFFF;"| Big Sky Women's Tournament

|-
!colspan=9 style="background:#a10022; color:#FFFFFF;"| WBI

See also
2016–17 Eastern Washington Eagles men's basketball team

References

Eastern Washington Eagles women's basketball seasons
Eastern Washington
Eastern Washington
Eastern Washington
Eastern Washington